Taqlidabad may refer to:
 Taqlidabad, Markazi
 Taqlidabad, West Azerbaijan